The .50 Browning Machine Gun (.50 BMG, 12.7×99mm NATO and designated as the 50 Browning by the C.I.P.) is a  caliber cartridge developed for the M2 Browning heavy machine gun in the late 1910s, entering official service in 1921. Under STANAG 4383, it is a standard service cartridge for NATO forces as well as many non-NATO countries. The cartridge itself has been made in many variants: multiple generations of regular ball, tracer, armor-piercing (AP), incendiary, and saboted sub-caliber rounds. The rounds intended for machine guns are made into a continuous belt using metallic links.

The .50 BMG cartridge is also used in anti-materiel rifles.  A wide variety of ammunition is available, and the availability of match grade ammunition has increased the usefulness of .50 caliber rifles by allowing more accurate fire than lower quality rounds.

History
In response to the need for new anti-aircraft weaponry during World War I, John Browning developed the .50 BMG. He wanted the round to be used in a machine gun, and wanted the machine gun to be based on a scaled-up version of the M1917 Browning. 

The development of the .50 BMG round is sometimes confused with the German 13.2 mm TuF, which was developed by Germany for an anti-tank rifle to combat British tanks during WWI and against aircraft.  According to the American Rifleman: "Actually, the Browning .50 originated in the Great War. American interest in an armor-piercing cartridge was influenced by the marginal French 11 mm design, prompting U.S. Army Ordnance officers to consult Browning. They wanted a heavy projectile at 2700 feet per second (f.p.s.), but the ammunition did not exist. Browning pondered the situation and, according to his son John, replied, 'Well, the cartridge sounds pretty good to start. You make up some cartridges and we'll do some shooting.'"

The American Rifleman further explains that development was "[r]eputedly influenced by Germany's 13.2x92 mm SR (.53-cal.) anti-tank rifle" and that then "Ordnance contracted with Winchester to design a .50-cal. cartridge. Subsequently, Frankford Arsenal took over from Winchester, producing the historic .50 BMG or 12.7x99 mm cartridge. The Army then returned to John Browning for the actual gun. Teamed with Colt, he produced prototypes ready for testing and, ironically, completed them by Nov. 11, 1918—the Great War's end."

The round was put into use in the M1921 Browning machine gun.

During World War II the .50 BMG was primarily used in the M2 Browning machine gun, in both its "light barrel" aircraft mount version and the "heavy barrel" (HB) version on ground vehicles, for anti-aircraft purposes. An upgraded variant of the M2 Browning HB machine gun used during World War II is still in use today. Since the mid-1950s, some armored personnel carriers and utility vehicles have been made to withstand 12.7 mm machine gun fire, restricting the destructive capability of the M2. It still has more penetrating power than lighter weapons such as general-purpose machine guns, though it is significantly heavier and more cumbersome to transport. Its range and accuracy, however, are superior to light machine guns when fixed on tripods, and it has not been replaced as the standard caliber for Western vehicle-mounted machine guns (Soviet and CIS armored vehicles mount 12.7×108mm NSVs, which have similar dimensions to .50 BMGs).

Decades later, the .50 BMG was chambered in high-powered rifles as well. The Barrett M82 rifle was developed during the 1980s and, along with later variants, has upgraded the anti-materiel power of the military sniper. A skilled sniper can effectively neutralize an infantry unit by eliminating several targets (soldiers or equipment) without revealing his precise location. The long range (over one mile) between firing position and target allows time for the sniper to avoid enemy retaliation by either changing positions repeatedly, or by safely retreating.

Typical uses
The primary military use of this round is in the M2 Browning machine gun and anti-materiel rifles such as the Barrett M82.

The U.S. Coast Guard uses .50 BMG rifles onboard armed helicopters to disable the engines on boats during interdictions. Similarly, .50 BMG weapons have attracted attention from law enforcement agencies; they have been adopted by the New York City Police Department as well as the Pittsburgh Police. A .50 BMG round can effectively disable a vehicle when fired into the engine block. A .50 BMG round will penetrate most commercial brick walls and concrete cinder blocks.

The .50 BMG round was used as a sniper round as early as the Korean War. This weapon was used by other snipers, and eventually purpose-built sniper rifles were developed specifically for this round.

Before that, a British sniper in Afghanistan held the record at  using a .338 Lapua Magnum (8.58×70 mm) rifle.

In addition to long-range and anti-materiel, the U.S. military uses .50 BMG weapons to detonate unexploded ordnance from a safe distance. It can disable most unarmored and lightly armored vehicles.

Some civilians use .50 caliber rifles for long-range target shooting: the US-based Fifty Caliber Shooters Association holds .50 BMG shooting matches.

Power

A common method for understanding the actual power of a cartridge is comparison of muzzle energies. Due to the high ballistic coefficient of the bullet, the .50 BMG's trajectory also suffers less "drift" from cross-winds than smaller and lighter calibers, making the .50 BMG a good choice for high-powered sniper rifles.

Cartridge dimensions

The round is a scaled-up version of the .30-06 Springfield but uses a case wall with a long taper to facilitate feeding and extraction in various weapons.

The primer type specified for this ammunition is a boxer primer that has a single centralized ignition point (US and NATO countries). However, some other countries produce the ammunition with Berdan primers that have two flash holes.

Military cartridge types 

The .50 BMG cartridge is also produced commercially in a wide range of specifications, including armor piercing, tracing, and incendiary. 

 Cartridge, caliber .50, tracer, M1
 This tracer is used for observing fire, signaling, target designation, and incendiary purposes. This bullet has a red tip.
 Cartridge, caliber .50, incendiary, M1
 This cartridge is used against unarmored, flammable targets. The incendiary bullet has a light blue tip
 Cartridge, caliber .50, ball, M2
 This cartridge is used against personnel and unarmored targets. This bullet has an unpainted tip.
 Cartridge, caliber .50, armor piercing (AP), M2
 This cartridge is used against lightly armored vehicles, protective shelters, and personnel, and can be identified by its black tip.
 Cartridge, caliber .50, armor-piercing incendiary (API), M8
 This cartridge is used, in place of the armor-piercing round, against armored, flammable targets. The bullet has a silver tip.
 Cartridge, caliber .50, tracer, M10
 Tracer for observing fire, signaling, target designation, and incendiary purposes. Designed to be less intense than the M1 tracer, the M10 has an orange tip.
 Cartridge, caliber .50, tracer, M17
 Tracer for observing fire, signaling, target designation, and incendiary purposes. Can be fired from the M82/M107 series of rifles.
 Cartridge, caliber .50, armor-piercing incendiary tracer (API-T), M20
 This cartridge is used in place of the armor-piercing round against armored, flammable targets, with a tracer element for observation purposes. This cartridge is effectively a variant of the M8 armor-piercing incendiary with the added tracer element. Can be fired from the M82/M107 series of rifles. This bullet has a red tip with a ring of aluminum paint.
 Cartridge, caliber .50, tracer, headlight, M21
 Tracer for use in observing fire during air-to-air combat. Designed to be more visible, the M21 is three times more brilliant than the M1 tracer.
 Cartridge, caliber .50, incendiary, M23
 This cartridge is used against unarmored, flammable targets. The tip of the bullet is painted blue with a light blue ring.
 Cartridge, caliber .50, ball, M33
 This cartridge is used against personnel and unarmored targets. Can be fired from the M82/M107 series of rifles.
 Cartridge, caliber .50, saboted light armor penetrator (SLAP), M903
 This cartridge has a 355 – 360 gr (23.00 – 23.33 g) heavy metal (tungsten) penetrator that is sabot-launched at a muzzle velocity of 4,000 ft/s (1,219 m/s). The 0.50 in (12.7 mm) diameter sabot is designed to separate after leaving the muzzle, releasing the 0.30 in (7.62 mm) penetrator. The sabot is injection molded of special high strength plastic and is reinforced with an aluminum insert in the base section. The cartridge is identified by an amber sabot (Ultem 1000). Used only in the M2 series of machine guns.
 Cartridge, caliber .50, saboted light armor penetrator tracer (SLAP-T), M962
 Like the M903, this is a SLAP round, with the only difference being that the M962 also has a tracer element for observing fire, target designation, and incendiary purposes. It has a red plastic sabot for identification, and is used only in the M2 series of machine guns.
 Cartridge, caliber .50, ball, XM1022
 A long-range match cartridge specifically designed for long-range work using the M107 rifle.
 Cartridge, caliber .50, M1022 long-range sniper
 The .50 caliber M1022 has an olive green bullet coating with no tip ID coloration. The projectile is of standard ball design. It is designed for long-range sniper training and tactical use against targets that do not require armor-piercing or incendiary effects. It exhibits superior long range accuracy and is trajectory matched to MK211 grade A. The M1022 is ideal for use in all .50 caliber bolt-action and semi-automatic sniper rifles.

 Cartridge, caliber .50, high-explosive incendiary armor-piercing (HEIAP), Mk 211 Mod 0
 A "combined effects" cartridge, the Raufoss Mk 211 Mod 0 HEIAP cartridge contains a .30 caliber tungsten penetrator, zirconium powder, and Composition A explosive. It can be used in any .50 caliber weapon in the US inventory with the exception of the M85 machine gun. The cartridge is identified by a green tip with a gray ring.
 Cartridge, caliber .50, armor-piercing incendiary dim tracer (API-DT), Mk 257
 The .50 caliber Mk 257 API-DT has a purple bullet tip. The bullet has a hardened steel core and incendiary tip. It is used in the M2, M3, and M85. Dim trace reduces the possibility of the weapon being located during night fire and is visible only with night-vision devices.
 Cartridge, caliber .50, armor-piercing (AP), Mk 263 Mod 2
 The .50 caliber Mk 263 has a black tip. The bullet has a hardened steel core and features double valleys to reduce bearing surface thereby decreasing friction and increasing stability. It is used in the M2, M3, and M85.
 Cartridge, caliber .50, armor-piercing incendiary tracer (API-T), Mk 300 Mod 0
 as with the Mk 211 Mod 0, but with a tracer component. This cartridge likely can be used in any .50 caliber weapon in the US inventory with the exception of the M85 machine gun, as with the Mk 211 Mod 0.
 Cartridge, caliber .50, armor piercing explosive incendiary (APEI), Mk 169 Mod 2
 This cartridge is used against hardened targets such as bunkers, for suppressive fire against lightly armored vehicles, and ground and aerial threat suppression. It is generally fired either from pilot-aimed aircraft-mounted guns or anti-aircraft platforms, both produced by FN Herstal. It is identified by a gray over yellow tip. A tracer variant of it also exists.
 Cartridge, caliber .50, ball, Mk 323 Mod 0
 Created by the Naval Surface Warfare Center Crane Division, this cartridge uses M33 ball projectiles in polymer cases instead of brass. It has a clear polymer case, with a standard brass head fused at the bottom. The Mk 323 can be fired from M2HB/M2A1 machine guns and GAU-21/A aircraft guns with the same performance. It gives a 25 percent weight savings over brass-cased ammunition and allows 40 percent more ammunition to be carried for the same weight. The Mk 323's polymer casing is applied to tracer, AP, API, and SLAP projectiles.

DARPA (Defense Advanced Research Projects Agency) contracted with Teledyne Scientific Company to develop the EXACTO program, including a .50-caliber guided bullet. Videos published by DARPA show the guided bullet diverting to strike a moving target.

Belt links
Three distinct and non-compatible metallic links have been used for .50 BMG cartridge belts. The M2 and M9 links, "pull-out" designs, are used in the Browning M2 and M3 machine guns. The M15-series metal "push-through" links were used in the M85 machine gun. Pull-out cloth belts were also used at one time, but have been obsolete since 1945.

Legal issues

United Kingdom
Within the United Kingdom, it is legal to own a bolt action .50 BMG rifle with a section 1 Firearms Certificate. Applications requesting firearms in this caliber are assessed by the same criteria as smaller calibers; with the applicant having to prove they have a valid reason for owning such a weapon.

United States
The oversized bullet is formed to the bore size upon firing, forming a tight seal and engaging the rifling. Subject to political controversy due to the great power of the cartridge (it is the most powerful commonly available cartridge not considered a destructive device under the National Firearms Act), it remains popular among long-range shooters for its accuracy and external ballistics.

A 1999 Justice Department Office of Special Investigations  briefing on .50 caliber rifle crime identified several instances of the .50 BMG being involved in criminal activities.

In the United States, Washington, D.C. disallows registration of .50 BMG rifles, thus rendering civilian possession unlawful. California prohibits the private purchase of a rifle capable of firing the .50 BMG through the .50 Caliber BMG Regulation Act of 2004. Connecticut specifically bans the Barrett 82A1 .50 BMG rifle. However, .50 BMG rifles registered prior to the enacted bans remain lawful to possess in California and Connecticut. In Illinois, it is legal to possess a .50 caliber rifle only if it was acquired by January 10, 2023, and it is registered with the state police by January 1, 2024. Maryland imposes additional regulations on the sale and transfer of .50 BMG rifles and other "regulated firearms", and limits purchases of any firearm within this class to one per month, but does not impose registration requirements or any form of categorical ban.

Contrary to a persistent misconception within the United States Armed Forces, using .50 BMG directly against enemy personnel is not prohibited by the laws of war. Writing for the Marine Corps Gazette, Maj Hays Parks states that "No treaty language exists (either generally or specifically) to support a limitation on [the use of .50 BMG] against personnel, and its widespread, longstanding use in this role suggests that such antipersonnel employment is the customary practice of nations." Parks theorizes that the misconception originated in historical doctrine discouraging the use of the M8C spotting rifle—an integral .50-caliber aiming aid for the M40 recoilless rifle—in the antipersonnel role. This limitation was entirely tactical in nature and was intended to hide the vulnerable M40 and its crew from the enemy until the main anti-tank gun was ready for firing; however, Parks concludes that some U.S. troops assumed the existence of a legal limitation on the use of .50-caliber projectiles more generally.

Partial list of .50 BMG firearms

Carbines
 Barrett M82CQ (a carbine version of the M82A3)
 Bushmaster BA50 carbine (22" barrel version of the BA50)
 Serbu Firearms BFG-50 Carbine (22" barrel version of the BFG-50 single-shot bolt-action)

Rifles
 Accuracy International AS50
 Accuracy International AW50
 Accuracy International AX50
 ArmaLite AR-50
 Arms Tech Ltd. TTR-50
 Barrett M82/M107
 Barrett M95
 Barrett M99
 Bushmaster BA50
 Cadex Defence CDX-50 Tremor
 Desert Tech HTI
 DSR-50
 Gepárd anti-materiel rifle
 McMillan TAC-50
 OM 50 Nemesis
 PGM Hécate II
 Pindad SPR-2
 Ramo M600
 Robar RC-50
 Serbu Firearms BFG-50 (single-shot bolt-action)
 Serbu Firearms BFG-50a (magazine fed semi-automatic)
 Serbu Firearms RN-50 (single-shot modified break-action)
 Snipex M
 Snipex Rhino Hunter
 Steyr HS .50
 WKW Wilk
 Zastava M93 Black Arrow

Machine guns
 GAU-19
 M1921 Browning machine gun
 M2 Browning machine gun
 M85 machine gun
 Rolls-Royce Experimental Machine Gun - only built as prototype
 STK 50MG
 XM218
 XM312
 XM806 (LW50)
 Kord machine gun - export variant

Pistols
Triple Action Thunder

Chain gun
Profense PF 50

See also

 .50 Caliber BMG Regulation Act of 2004
 .50 caliber handguns
 .510 DTC EUROP
 .510 Whisper
 12 mm caliber
 12.7×108mm (Russian equivalent)
 14.5×114mm
 Gun laws in the United States (by state)
 List of firearms
 List of rifle cartridges
 NATO EPVAT testing
 Table of handgun and rifle cartridges

References

50 BMG
50 BMG
12.7×99mm
NATO cartridges
Weapons and ammunition introduced in 1921
Winchester Repeating Arms Company cartridges